Namiseom or Nami Island is a half-moon shaped river island located in Chuncheon, Gangwon Province, South Korea, formed as the land around it was inundated by the rising water of the North Han River as the result of the construction of Cheongpyeong Dam in 1944.

Etymology
The name of the island originates from General Nami, who died at the age of 28 after being falsely accused of treason during the reign of King Sejo, the seventh king of the Joseon Dynasty of Korea. Although his grave was not discovered, there were a pile of stones where his body was supposed to be buried. It was believed that if someone took even one stone from there, it would bring misfortune to their house. A tour company arranged the grave with soil and then developed Namiseom into an amusement park.

Geography

History 
Min Byeong-do bought the island in 1965, and after that, in 1966, when Gyeongchun Tourism Development Co., Ltd. was established, it began to be developed as a general resort. In April 2000, Gyeongchun Tourism Development changed its name to Nami Island Co., Ltd.

In 2002, the area around Nami Island became the filming stage for the Korean Broadcasting System TV drama Winter Sonata, and the number of Japanese tourists visiting Nami increased significantly.

Naminara Republic
Namiseom is home to the Naminara Republic, a self-declared micronation described as  "a tourist destination that advocates the concept of a nation." On 20 July 2018, a retired M48 Patton tank was received from the Republic of Korea Armed Forces.

Gallery

References

1944 establishments in Korea
1966 establishments in South Korea
Islands of Gangwon Province, South Korea
Tourist attractions in Gangwon Province, South Korea
Private islands of South Korea
River islands of South Korea
Islands of the Han River (Korea)
Chuncheon
Republics
Micronations